King's School was a secondary school in Gütersloh, North Rhine-Westphalia, Germany. Serving the children of British military families stationed in the area, it is the largest school in Service Children's Education. It was the only SCE secondary school in the area and also served children from bases in Bielefeld, Herford, Detmold, and Paderborn.

History
King's School opened its doors to its first pupils on 19 September 1960. The first headteacher was Mr Jack Reynish. Later heads included Mr D.D. Rooney, Mr Ken Jones, Mr Rob McGraw and Mrs Sheila Hargreaves. Boarding accommodation at King's Hall opened in September 1994.

Campus
Situated within Mansergh Barracks, the school buildings were originally barrack blocks but have been modernised throughout to provide spacious teaching accommodation. The school also houses the Gütersloh Music Centre which provides weekly instrumental tuition for about 200 young people.

The playing fields, including astro-turf, are extensive, with pitches for hockey, football, rugby, netball, cricket and athletics. Two gymnasia are complemented by the Army gymnasium / Sports Hall. The school also has access to a nearby swimming pool and a tartan surface athletics track for Sports Day.

Curriculum
The school follows the National Curriculum.

Extracurricular activities
Student organisations and activities include art club, chess, dance, digital photography, drama, the Duke of Edinburgh award scheme, fashion design, film club, gardening, jogging and fitness club, juggling, Language Ambassadors, lawn games, karate, printmaking, quilting, remote control cars, study support, textiles, ultimate frisbee, Warhammer, World Challenge, and yearbook.

Sports include athletics, basketball, football, golf, hockey, netball, rugby, and tennis. Students compete in lunchtime inter-form competitions, SCE inter-school festivals and GISST, the International Schools Group competitions. The school has been recognised with the Sportsmark Award twice since 2003.

Notable former pupils
 Tim Montgomerie, co-founder of the Centre for Social Justice, creator of the ConservativeHome website, columnist at The Times newspaper, blogger and political activist
 Cpl Gordon Pritchard, the 100th British servicemember killed in the Iraq War

Steven Newman, Published Author, Senior Civil Servant for the UK MoD. Creator & instigator of the 5 eyes (UK, US, Australian, Canadian & New Zealand Armed Forces) financial crime intelligence sharing forum that helps identify corrupt activity in operational and non operational areas. Newman also assists foreign military forces to implement anti-corruption frameworks. Newman was at Kings School 1976-1977. 

Anoneumouse: Attended from 1967 to 1969 when It was still a BFES School. Excelled in Geography and Art, went on to be an Avionics technician with CSE Aviation and then became the Radio Communications Manager at RAC Motering Services. Also the creator of the Blog "The Anglo Saxon Chronicle" http://saxontimes.blogspot.com/

References

External links

British international schools in Germany
Schools in North Rhine-Westphalia
Educational institutions established in 1960
Gütersloh
Service Children's Education
1960 establishments in West Germany